Dungarvan is a coastal town and harbour in County Waterford, on the south-east coast of Ireland. Prior to the merger of Waterford County Council with Waterford City Council in 2014, Dungarvan was the county town and administrative centre of County Waterford. Waterford City and County Council retains administrative offices in the town. The town's Irish name means "Garbhann's fort", referring to Saint Garbhann who founded a church there in the seventh century. The town lies on the N25 road (European route E30), which connects Cork, Waterford and Rosslare Europort.

Location and access
Dungarvan is situated at the mouth of the Colligan River, which divides the town into two parishes - that of Dungarvan to the west, and that of Abbeyside to the east -, these being connected in three places by a causeway and single-span bridge built by the Dukes of Devonshire starting in 1801; by an old railway bridge; and by a ring-road causeway and bridge.

History

Evidence of ancient settlement in the Dungarvan area includes standing stone, ringfort, bullaun and reputed paleolithic burial sites in the surrounding townlands, including in Luskanargid, Kilgreany, Kilrush and Mapestown. Several sources propose that the town is of Viking origin, and evidence of Hiberno-Norse settlement in the area dates to at least the 10th century.

The Anglo-Norman Dungarvan Castle, commissioned in the late 12th or early 13th century by King John of England, stands by the harbour on the site of an earlier (possibly Hiberno-Norse) fortification. The structure of Dungarvan Castle, including a shell keep of a type atypical in Ireland, dates to c.1209.

A 13th century Augustinian abbey, now the site of Saint Augustine's Catholic Church (built 1832), was founded by Thomas FitzMaurice FitzGerald (c.1145–1213). The remains of another 13th century church, on the opposite side of the harbour, are similarly found on the grounds of Saint Mary's church (built 1831).

The town of Dungarvan was incorporated in the 15th century, was represented by two members in the Irish Parliament until the Act of Union in 1801, and returned one member to the Westminster Parliament until 1885. Unlike nearby Waterford and Duncannon, Dungarvan surrendered without a siege in the Cromwellian conquest of Ireland (1649–53).

The remains of a woolly mammoth were discovered in the town in 1859 by postmaster and amateur antiquarian Edward Brenan.

The 1921 Burgery ambush, an incident in the Irish War of Independence, took place near the town.

Irish language
As of the 2011 census, approximately 3% of the town's population, or 242 persons were then daily Irish speakers, outside of the education system. Irish language immersion education is available at pre-school and primary school level in Dungarvan's Gaelscoil, Scoil Garbhán. The Irish Language Officer of Waterford City and County Council is based in Dungarvan.

There are a range of activities and projects undertaken to strengthen the Irish language in the town. An Irish in Business award was established in 2009 to recognise businesses in Dungarvan and West Waterford who work to promote the Irish language.

The town is home to an office of Glór na nGael, a national body that promotes the Irish language in three areas, the language in the family, in Business and enterprise, and community development. The Dungarvan office is responsible for Glór na nGael’s work across South Leinster and most of Munster.

There is also contact between the town and the nearby Gaeltacht area of Ring, County Waterford and Old Parish which make up Gaeltacht na nDéise. Dungarvan was identified as a potential 'Gaeltacht Service Town' under the Gaeltacht Act 2012.

Geography
Dungarvan is situated at the mouth of the Colligan River. Dungarvan Harbour as such is formed by The Quay (on the town side) and The Causeway. A single-span bridge was built in the late 18th century by Lord Devonshire to link Dungarvan with Abbeyside and indeed Waterford via said causeway. The Cunnigar encloses the estuary of the River Brickey which flows out to sea at Abbeyside without actually joining the Colligan. The two estuaries are separated by "The Point".

Religion
A friary in Abbeyside, founded by the Augustinians in the 13th century, is partially incorporated with the structure of a 20th-century Roman Catholic church. One of the most significant colleges in the town was also founded by these Augustinians, whose order remains active locally and maintains a parish church nearer to Main Street.

Toponymy
In everyday local usage, "Dungarvan" is taken to refer to the western, more commercial half of the town, where the administrative buildings and shopping areas are situated.

Transport

Road
Dungarvan is positioned on the N25 national primary road and the R672 and R675 regional roads.

Maritime

The town is separated from the open ocean by a shallow, eastward-facing bay. At its mouth, the bay is about two miles wide, with Dungarvan lying about four miles from the mouth. A meandering navigation channel marked by red/green buoys leads into Dungarvan from the ocean. For most vessels (except small dinghies) this channel is not navigable at low tide. Even at high tide, cruising yachts and larger vessels must be careful to remain in the buoyed channel. There is a well-maintained concrete slipway in Dungarvan town, suitable for launching vessels up to eight metres in length. However, larger vessels should only use it up to three hours either side of high tide. Moorings are usually made available to visiting yachts by Dungarvan Harbour Sailing Club, often free of charge.

Bus
Dungarvan is served by several bus routes. The Cork to London Eurolines coach, which provides a daily overnight cross channel service, stops at Dungarvan. Bus Éireann Expressway route number 40 runs hourly in each direction providing a link to Cork, Waterford and Rosslare Europort. Bus Éireann's route number 362 also provides a commuter link to Waterford. Several Local Link bus services terminate in the town, including the service to Tallow via Lismore. Dublin Coach serve the town on its M9 Cork to Dublin route via Waterford, passing through every two hours.

Rail
Until 1967 Dungarvan had a railway station on the now dismantled Mallow to Waterford line and was served by the Rosslare to Cork boat train. A greenway has been developed along the former line to Waterford.

Local government

While there is evidence of local governance in Dungarvan from at least the 15th century, the town's commissioners was established in 1855. Following the passing of the Local Government (Ireland) Act 1898, the local authority became an urban district council in 1899. After becoming a town council in 2002, and in common with all other town councils in Ireland, it was abolished under the Local Government Reform Act 2014.

The local electoral area (LEA) of Dungarvan continues to elect six councillors to Waterford City and County Council. With the three seat LEA of Lismore, it forms the Municipal District of Dungarvan — Lismore. Meetings of the Dungarvan/Lismore District Council are held in the Civic Offices, Dungarvan.

Industry
GlaxoSmithKline's consumer products division has a manufacturing plant in Dungarvan which, as of 2011, employed approximately 700 people. The town is also the home of Radley Engineering, the company responsible for manufacturing the Spire of Dublin.
Dungarvan previously had a tannery, a distillery, a gasworks, and a fishing fleet. In the later 20th century, a source of trade and employment was Dungarvan Cooperative (creamery), which connected the town of Dungarvan with its agricultural hinterland.

International relations

Twin towns – sister cities
Dungarvan has been twinned with Erie, Pennsylvania in the US since March 2007. Mercyhurst College, located in Erie, hosts the Global Intelligence Forum held annually in Dungarvan.

Entente Florale 
Dungarvan participated in the 2018 Entente Florale competition, organised by the European Association for Flowers and Landscape (AEFP), and received a silver medal.

Literature
Tadhg Gaelach Ó Súilleabháin (c. 1715 – 1795), a composer of 18th century Irish bardic poetry, lived in Dungarvan for several years. While there, he experienced a religious conversion and subsequently wrote mainly Christian poetry in Munster Irish.

The British poet laureate, Sir John Betjeman (who lived in Ireland from 1941 to 1943) mentions Dungarvan in his poem, "The Irish Unionist's Farewell to Greta Hellstrom". Each stanza closes with the line, "Dungarvan in the rain". Irish poet Mai O'Higgins was born on Saint Mary Street in the town centre.

Dungarvan is referred to in the collection of short stories Labyrinths by Jorge Luis Borges: "He was Irish, from Dungarvan. Having said this, he stopped short, as if he had revealed a secret". Dungarvan is also mentioned in the 2002 novel The Story of Lucy Gault by William Trevor.

People

Niamh Briggs, rugby player
Tom Cunningham, hurler
John Deasy, politician
Austin Deasy, politician
Maura Derrane, television presenter and journalist
Moe Dunford, actor
George Lennon, Irish Republican Army leader
Christy Moylan, hurler
Tadhg Gaelach Ó Súilleabháin Timothy O'Sullivan (c. 1715 – 1795), bard in Munster Irish
Robert Power, cyclist
Tom Queally, jockey
Stephen Spratt, cyclist
Ernest Walton, physicist and Nobel laureate

See also
List of towns and villages in Ireland
Market Houses in Ireland

References

External links
 
 
 Official Dungarvan Tourist Information
 Digital Atlas of Dungarvan Irish Historic Towns Atlas, Royal Irish Academy

 
County towns in the Republic of Ireland
Parishes of the Roman Catholic Diocese of Waterford and Lismore
Towns and villages in County Waterford